"Baam" (stylized as "BAAM") is a song recorded by South Korean girl group Momoland. It was released on June 26, 2018 by MLD Entertainment and distributed by Kakao M as the lead single from the group's fourth extended play, Fun to the World. The Japanese version of the song was released by King Records on November 7, 2019. The track was written by Shinsadong Tiger and Bum x Nangi, with Shinsadong Tiger credited as the producer.

The accompanying music video for the song was uploaded onto 1theK's YouTube channel simultaneously with the single's release. To promote the single, the group performed on several South Korean music show programs, such as M Countdown and Inkigayo. Commercially, "Baam" peaked at number thirteen on South Korea's Gaon Digital Chart.

Composition 

"Baam" is a K-pop, electropop and electro swing song. The song was composed and written by Shinsadong Tiger, Bum (Lee Gil-beom) and Nangi (Jwa Haeng-suk).

Background and release
Momoland released their third extended play Great! in January 2018, with its lead single "Bboom Bboom" which became a hit single. Following the success of "Bboom Bboom", it was announced on May 24, 2018 by MLD Entertainment that the group would be returning on June 26, 2018 with a dance track produced by Shinsadong Tiger.

Prior to the release of "Baam", teasers featuring photos of Momoland from the extended play's photoshoot, a snippet of the song and clips from its music video were released online in June 2018. The song was officially released on June 26, 2018 by MLD Entertainment and distributed by Kakao M as the group's fifth single. It served as the lead single of their fourth extended play, Fun to the World. An instrumental of the song was included in the extended play as the fifth track. The dance practice video was uploaded on July 2, 2018.

The Japanese version was released on November 7, 2018. It was included in the 2019 release of the group's debut studio album, Chiri Chiri.

"Baam" is the final single of Momoland to feature members Daisy and Taeha, who left the group in 2020 and 2019 respectively.

Critical reception
Seoul Beats stated the song is an "improvement" compare to the group's previous single "Bboom Bboom", and called it a "knockout." Kelly Sipko of The Kraze Magazine said the "vintage pop sound hooks up instantly before exploding into a strong, groovy tenor saxophone line."

Commercial performance 
In South Korea, "Baam" debuted at number twenty-seven on the Gaon Digital Chart, for the week of June 30, 2018. In its second week, the song rose to number fifteen and to number fourteen in its third week. In its fourth week, the song peaked at number thirteen. The song was the fifteenth best-selling song of July 2018. The song was also the twentieth best selling for August, fifty-third for September and ninety-second for October.

In Japan, the Japanese version of "Baam" debuted and peaked at number eight on the Oricon Singles Chart, with 12,126 physical copies sold in its first week. On the Billboard Japan Hot 100, it peaked at number twelve. The song also debuted at number eight on Billboard Japan'''s Top Singles Sales with 13,665 estimated sales.

Music videos

The music video was uploaded to 1theK's official YouTube channel on June 26, 2018, in conjunction with the release of the single. The video features the group in backdrops depicting countries around the world, including the Philippines, Korea, Vietnam, France, Mexico, Egypt and the United States. Seoul Beats said the choreography is the "stand out" of the video, but criticized the video for "few poorly thought-out moments that run the risk of overshadowing everything else." Kelly Sipko of The Kraze Magazine said the "juxtaposition of the contemporary choreography set against the vintage settings makes for such an interesting concept." It was the ninth most viewed music video in YouTube for a South Korean artist in 2018, that was released in the same year. A performance version of the music video was published on July 17, 2018.

The music video for the Japanese version of the song was uploaded to J-Rock's official YouTube channel on October 5, 2018. A dance version of the music video was published on November 19, 2018.

Live performances
Momoland promoted "Baam" by performing on several music programs in South Korea including Inkigayo, M Countdown, Music Bank, The Show, Show Champion, Show! Music Core and Simply K-Pop''.

Track listing

Charts

Credits and personnel
Credits adapted from Melon.
 Momoland – vocals
 Beom x Nang – composer, lyricist
 Shinsadong Tiger – composer, lyricist, arrangement

Release history

References 

Momoland songs
2018 singles
2018 songs
Electro swing songs
Japanese-language songs
Kakao M singles
King Records (Japan) singles
Korean-language songs
Songs written by Shinsadong Tiger
Song recordings produced by Shinsadong Tiger